Jörg Müller (born 23 January 1961) is a retired track cyclist and road bicycle racer from Switzerland, who was a professional rider from 1985 to 1994. He represented his native country at the 1984 Summer Olympics in Los Angeles. He won the Tour de Romandie in 1985. He was the Swiss National Road Race champion in 1987.

Career achievements

Major results

1984
 1st  Individual pursuit, National Track Championships
 10th Overall GP Tell
1st Stage 2
1985
 1st  Overall Tour de Romandie
 2nd Grand Prix Cycliste Union Bessègeoise
 6th Critérium des As
 8th Overall Tour of the Basque Country
1st Stage 5
 8th La Flèche Wallonne
 8th Paris–Camembert
 8th Grand Prix des Nations
 10th Overall Tour de Suisse
1st Stage 8
1986
 1st  Overall Tour d'Armorique
 1st Prologue Volta a Catalunya
 3rd Overall Volta a la Comunitat Valenciana
1st Stage 5
 3rd Overall Vuelta a Aragón
 4th Overall Vuelta a Andalucía
 5th Paris–Tours
 7th Overall Tour de Romandie
 7th Giro di Lombardia
 10th Overall Tour de Suisse
1987
 1st  Road race, National Road Championships
 1st Stage 6 Volta a Catalunya
 6th Overall Tour de Luxembourg
1988
 1st Six Days of Zürich (with Daniel Gisiger)
 8th Overall Vuelta a Andalucía
1989
 1st Grand Prix des Amériques
 3rd Overall Tour de Suisse
 6th Overall Four Days of Dunkirk
1990
 10th Trofeo Baracchi
1993
 1st Wartenberg Rundfahrt
 1st Stage 9 Tour DuPont
 4th Josef Voegeli Memorial
1994
 1st Wartenberg Rundfahrt

Grand Tour general classification results timeline

References

External links

1961 births
Living people
Cyclists at the 1984 Summer Olympics
Olympic cyclists of Switzerland
Swiss male cyclists
People from Aarau
Tour de Suisse stage winners
Sportspeople from Aargau